Individual Partnership Action Plans (IPAP) are plans developed between NATO and different countries which outline the objectives and the communication framework for dialogue and cooperation between both parties. NATO launched the IPAPs initiative at the 2002 Prague Summit.

Participation 

Individual Partnership Action Plans (IPAPs) are in implementation with the following countries:

  (29 October 2004)
  (27 May 2005)
  (16 December 2005)
  (31 January 2006)
  (19 May 2006)
  (10 September 2008)
  (15 January 2015)

Armenia, Azerbaijan, Kazakhstan, Moldova and Serbia have stated they have no current intention to join NATO, but all of them participate in NATO's Partnership for Peace program. Georgia and Ukraine are currently undergoing Intensified Dialogue for NATO membership while Bosnia and Herzegovina has a Membership Action Plan and is actively working towards joining NATO.

Montenegro had an IPAP with NATO from 20 June 2008 until it acceded to NATO on 5 June 2017.

Ukraine

Ukraine's relationship with NATO is governed by the NATO–Ukraine Action Plan, adopted on 22 November 2002.  In April 2005, Ukraine entered into Intensified Dialogue with NATO, and during the 2008 Bucharest summit NATO declared that Ukraine could become a member of NATO when it wants to join and meets the criteria for accession.  However, under the foreign policy of new President Viktor Yanukovych in 2010, Ukraine announced that it no longer had NATO membership as a goal, and passed a law stipulating the country's non-aligned status.  Following months of Euromaidan street protests that began because of his refusal to sign an Association Agreement with the European Union in favor of deals from Russia, President Yanukovych was overthrown.  In response to Russian involvement in eastern Ukraine and the alleged deployment of Russian troops on Ukrainian soil, the Ukrainian Prime Minister Yatsenyuk announced his intentions to resume the bid for NATO integration in August 2014, and in December 2014, Ukraine's parliament voted to drop non-aligned status.

See also

 Euro-Atlantic Partnership Council
 Foreign relations of NATO
 Partnership for Peace

References

External links
Individual Partnership Action Plans Website

Enlargement of NATO
2002 in international relations
Action plans
Post-Soviet alliances